Ralph David Oliphant-Callum (born 26 September 1971) is an English educator and former first-class cricketer.

Early life and career 
Oliphant-Callum was born at Twickenham in September 1971. He was educated at Brighton College, before going up to Brasenose College, Oxford. While studying at Oxford, he played first-class cricket for Oxford University, making his debut against Durham at Oxford in 1992. He played first-class cricket for Oxford until 1993, making five appearances. Playing as a wicket-keeper, he scored a total of 48 runs with a high score of 19. After graduating from Oxford, he became a schoolteacher. He is the current housemaster of Durnford House at Eton College.

References

External links

1971 births
Living people
Sportspeople from Twickenham
People educated at Brighton College
Alumni of Brasenose College, Oxford
English cricketers
Oxford University cricketers
Teachers at Eton College